De Waal is a village in the Dutch province of North Holland. It is a part of the municipality of Texel, and lies about 15 km north of Den Helder.

The village was first mentioned in 1295 as "sancti Bonifacii in Waelkerken", and means "pond created after a dike breach". De Waal started to developed after the Waalenburg polder was created in 1436. The Dutch Reformed church is built on a terp (artificial hill). It was destroyed in 1945 during the Georgian uprising. A new church was built in 1952 and a tower was added in 1961.

Gallery

References

Populated places in North Holland
Texel